is a Prefectural Natural Park in western Ōita Prefecture, Japan.

See also
 National Parks of Japan

References

External links
  Maps of Tsue Sankei Prefectural Natural Park

Parks and gardens in Ōita Prefecture
Protected areas established in 1951
1951 establishments in Japan